Events from the year 1994 in the United Arab Emirates.

Incumbents
President: Zayed bin Sultan Al Nahyan 
Prime Minister: Maktoum bin Rashid Al Maktoum

Incidents

 Sarah Balabagan arrested.

 
Years of the 20th century in the United Arab Emirates
United Arab Emirates
United Arab Emirates
1990s in the United Arab Emirates